Kaiparathina praecellens is a species of sea snail, a marine gastropod mollusk in the family Trochidae. It is only known as a fossil.

References

 Laws, C.R. (1941) The molluscan faunule at Pakaurangi Point, Kaipara. No. 2. Transactions of the Royal Society of New Zealand, 71, 134-151, pls. 16-19

External links
 To World Register of Marine Species

praecellens